Shahrak-e Vali Asr (also Romanized as Shahrak-e Valī ʿAṣr) is a village in Ojarud-e Gharbi Rural District of the Central District of Germi County, Ardabil province, Iran. At the 2006 census, its population was 1,342 in 288 households. The following census in 2011 counted 1,973 people in 434 households. The latest census in 2016 showed a population of 1,591 people in 456 households; it was the largest village in its rural district.

References 

Germi County

Towns and villages in Germi County

Populated places in Ardabil Province

Populated places in Germi County